is a Japanese light novel series written by Kisetsu Morita and illustrated by Benio. It was serialized online since 2016 on the user-generated novel publishing website Shōsetsuka ni Narō and, in the following year, it was acquired by SB Creative, who published the first light novel volume in 2017. The light novel has been licensed in North America by Yen Press, who published the first volume in April 2018. It has received a manga adaptation by Yūsuke Shiba in the same year as its debut of the light novel in Square Enix's Gangan Online website, also licensed by Yen Press. An anime television series adaptation by Revoroot aired from April to June 2021. A second season has been announced. The series has also spawned various spin-off novels.

Plot
After living a painful life as an office worker, Azusa ends up dying from overworking. She finds herself reincarnated as an undying, unaging witch in a new world, and now she vows to spend her days as pleasantly and stress-free as possible. She makes a living by hunting slimes, the easiest targets. But after centuries of doing this simple job, she has become extremely powerful and finds that she can no longer maintain her low-key lifestyle.

Characters

A former Japanese office worker reincarnated as an immortal witch, called . Weary of any overwork and excitement following her untimely death in her old life, she strives for an easy tune of existence, but once word gets out of her unprecedented prowess, she finds herself beleaguered by challengers trying to prove themselves on her, or all sorts of people willing to join her. However, she is compassionate and in time becomes very protective of her adopted family - much to the chagrin of anyone who deliberately endangers them.

A roughly 300-year-old shape-shifting red dragon girl. Originally arrogant, she came to Azusa to fight her and prove herself the stronger of them. After getting soundly beaten by Azusa, she joins her as her first apprentice and housekeeper. 

An about 50-year-old slime spirit girl, and the elder of twin sisters. Both she and her sister Shalsha are reincarnations of the slime creatures that Azusa killed for a living; but while Shalsha is initially deeply resentful towards Azusa, Falfa adores her and considers her their "mother".

Falfa's younger slime spirit twin sister. Driven by feelings of revenge against Azusa for killing all the slimes, she learned a type of magic which is effective against one specific race only, but in turn is potent enough to counter even Azusa's magic; she is also very learned in magic lore. After being very easily beaten by Laika, Shalsha and Falfa join Azusa's household upon her invitation. She is very inquisitive, and habitually takes notes of anything new she comes across.

A young (about 225-year-old) female elf apothecary woman from Frant Province with very abrupt mood swings and a voluptuous build. She invented an extremely popular, alcohol-based energy drink; but when the demon lord Beelzebub drank from it, she went sick (from overworking after getting addicted to it) and then went after Halkara, whereupon the elf, believing that Beelzebub wanted in fact revenge, fled to Azusa for protection. After being given shelter, and after the misunderstanding with Beelzebub is cleared, Halkara decides to stay with Azusa and restart the production of her energy drink. She is very knowledgable about mushrooms, but scatterbrained and accident-prone.

An about 3,000-year-old high-ranking female demon, the Agriculture Minister of the Demon Realm, and Lord of the Flies. Chasing after Halkara after getting addicted to her energy drink - so that its production could be re-started - she challenges Azusa to a fight, but collapses from exhaustion and is nursed back to health by her and Halkara. After the misunderstanding was cleared, she leaves peacefully but vows to come back to settle her score with Azusa (which she ultimately loses) and get more of Halkara's drink, although she begins to settle in as one of Azusa's "family".

An over 400-year-old blue dragon girl who first meets Azusa and her extended family while she and her flock attempt to disrupt the wedding of Laika's older sister, out of simple jealousy that her blunt demeanor drove away her own fiance. After Azusa single-handedly thrashes the aggressors, and a final act of aggression is stalled by Beelzebub, she is forced to sign a peace treaty between the red and blue dragons. Afterwards, as part of her peace obligations, she also (much to Laika's disgust) joins Azusa's troupe - the only alternative being to commit suicide due to her inbred discipline.

A ghost girl who died about 200 years previously at the age of 15. The daughter of a merchant who had fallen on hard times, she committed suicide after learning that her father wanted to sell her off as a prostitute. Her restless ghost began haunting the merchant's estate, which later became the site for Halkara's new energy drink factory. After being caught by Azusa, Halkara and Beelzebub, she is - with some effort - relocated to Azusa's house and joins her adopted family.

A leviathan woman, Beelzebub's secretary, and Vania's older sister. She and Vania are both shapeshifters, able to assume the form of a gigantic, flying whale. Despite the myth that leviathans are water creatures, they are actually air dwellers, and are usually employed as living transportation (complete with a resort hotel on their backs) by demons, devils and their privileged guests. To fulfill this obligation, both sisters work in tandem: While one does the transport, the other uses the hotel facilities (especially the bath) to relax.

A leviathan woman, Beelzebub's assistant secretary, and Fatla's younger sister.

An over 1,000-year-old demon girl and the "King" of the Demon Realm from its capital city Vanzeld. Despite her awe-inspiring title, her natural form is a cute, petite girl with ram horns and three tails, and she is - most of the time - surprisingly cheerful and informal. She has also a submission complex; after being accidentally knocked out by Halkara, and with Azusa beating her in a duel over Halkara's life, she gladly submits to her "conqueror".

In manga: 
In anime: 
A normal slime which is completely black.
Smarsly (in manga) / Intellie (in anime) is name given to it by Azusa. (Shortened name is used in light novel volume 12 and later.)

In anime: 

A magician slime girl who looks like 15-year-old blond girl, but is 300-year-old woman.
Wizly (in light novel and manga) / Magie (in anime) is name given to her by Azusa.

In anime: 

An about 300-year-old fighter slime girl whom Azusa and the others seek out when Falfa is stuck in slime form after getting a crick in her neck. She is very materialistic and considers fighting a means to collect more and more prizes. After being easily beaten by Azusa, she decides to join her as a martial arts apprentice.
Fighsly (in light novel and manga) / Fightie (in anime) is name which she herself decided to use, and was not given to her by Azusa.

An over 150-year-old immortal witch, called . Naive and deadly shy, but yearning for recognition, she usurps the title of "Highland Witch" to capitalize on Azusa's reputation and make herself some new friends. When Azusa hears of the fake, she confronts Eno and afterwards helps her in selling her mandragora-based medicines, which prove extremely popular. Her title stems from the location of her workshop, which is situated inside a hard-to-reach underground location, thus contributing to her initial lack of renown.

An undead catgirl who died 40 years ago after she became so lazy from boredom that she forgot to even feed herself. After rising from death, she became a graveyard security guard, but felt lonely without anyone keeping her company. Azusa solves the problem by suggesting to Beelzebub that Pondeli is made a demon casino gambler, since the catgirl is wickedly good at playing cards.

An about 80-year-old almiraj minstrel girl.

A droplet spirit woman.

An over 300-year-old mandragora girl.

A pine spirit woman. The being who mediated marriages.

An about 60,000 to 70,000-year-old jellyfish spirit and wanderting artist woman.

The goddess. The very being who reincarnated Azusa into this world.

A ghost girl. Sovereign of the ghost's kingdom of the dead. She died at 15 years old, and about 5,000 years have passed since her death.

The goddess of time. A goddess long worshipped in this world.

A slime spirit girl born after Falfa and Shalsha.

Media

Light novels
Originally, the series was published by Kisetsu Morita on the user-generated web novel site Shōsetsuka ni Narō in 2016. The publisher SB Creative acquired the series and then began publishing it on their GA Novel imprint as a light novel in January 2017. Twenty volumes have been released as of April 2022.

In the volumes 5 to 7, 20, and 21 of the light novel, a special story about the character Beelzebub was published at the end of those volumes. In September 2019, those stories were compiled into its own volume and the spin-off, called , published by SB Creative on the GA Novel imprint with Kisetsu Morita and Benio as the author and illustrator, respectively.

In the volumes 8 to 10 of the light novel, another spin-off light novel called {{Nihongo|Food for an Elf'''|エルフのごはん|Erufu no Gohan|lead=yes}}, a special story about the character Halkara was published at the end of those volumes.

In the volumes 11 to 13, 16, and 18 to 19 of the light novel, another spin-off light novel called  a special story about the character Laika was published at the end of those volumes.

In the volume 17 of the light novel, another spin-off light novel called , a special story about the character Wynona was published at the end of those volume.

Manga
In June 2017, Square Enix began publishing a manga adaptation of the series by Yūsuke Shiba in their online website and smartphone app Gangan Online, with eleven tankōbon volumes released as of June 2022.

A manga adaptation of the spin-off light novel I Was a Bottom-Tier Bureaucrat for 1,500 Years, and the Demon King Made Me a Minister was launched on Square Enix's Gangan Online website and smartphone app, with Meishi Murakami reprising his work.

A manga adaptation of the spin-off light novel Red Dragon Women Academy was launched on Square Enix's Manga UP! smartphone app, with Hitsujibako reprising his work.

Anime
An anime television series adaptation was announced during a livestream for the "GA Fes 2019" event on October 19, 2019. The series is animated by Revoroot and directed by Nobukage Kimura, with Tatsuya Takahashi handling series' composition, Keisuke Goto designing the characters, and Keiji Inai composing the series' music. The series aired from April 10 to June 26, 2021, on AT-X, Tokyo MX, and BS11. Aoi Yūki performed the opening theme song , while Azumi Waki performed the ending theme song "Viewtiful Days!". Crunchyroll licensed the series outside of Asia. In Southeast Asia and South Asia, Muse Communication licensed the series and will stream it on iQIYI, Bilibili, CATCHPLAY+, and other platforms. The company also has licensed the anime to Animax Asia for TV broadcasts.

In January 2022, it was announced that a second season was green-lit.

Episode list

Reception
The light novel ranked ninth in 2019 in Takarajimasha's annual light novel guide book Kono Light Novel ga Sugoi! in the tankōbon category.

Notes

References

External links
 I've Been Killing Slimes for 300 Years and Maxed Out My Level  
  
  
 Spin-off''
  
  
  
  
 

2017 Japanese novels
2021 anime television series debuts
Anime and manga based on light novels
AT-X (TV network) original programming
Crunchyroll anime
Fiction about reincarnation
Gangan Comics manga
Gangan Online manga
Isekai anime and manga
Isekai novels and light novels
Japanese fantasy novels
Japanese webcomics
Light novels
Light novels first published online
Muse Communication
Revoroot
Shōnen manga
Shōsetsuka ni Narō
Upcoming anime television series
Webcomics in print
Yen Press titles